Ahn Sung-Nam (born April 17, 1984) is a South Korean footballer who  plays as a midfielder for Gyeongnam FC.

Club career

Ulsan Mipo Dockyard
After he graduated from Chung-Ang University, he joined Korea National League's side Ulsan Hyundai Mipo Dockyard. He was scored 19 goals for two seasons.

Gangwon FC
In 2009, he moved to the newly formed Gangwon FC as a founding member with former Ulsan Hyundai Mipo Dockyard manager Choi Soon-Ho. At the first K-League match against Jeju United, he was injured unexpectedly and will have to go through rehab for eight weeks. On 15 August 2009, he scored his first K-League goal against Chunnam Dragons.

Gwangju FC
In January 2011, Ahn Sung-Nam joined Gwangju FC on loan for 1 year. After a loan spell, he completed his free transfer to Gwangju on 25 December 2011.

Statistics

Honours

Club
Ulsan Hyundai Mipo Dockyard
Korea National League (2) : 2007, 2008
Korean President's Cup (1) : 2008

References

External links

1984 births
Living people
South Korean footballers
Gangwon FC players
Gwangju FC players
Gyeongnam FC players
K League 1 players
K League 2 players
K3 League players
Korea National League players
Association football midfielders